Mailly-Maillet is a commune in the Somme department in Hauts-de-France in northern France.

Geography

History
It is close to the area of the Battle of the Somme. There are two military cemeteries which are maintained by the Commonwealth War Graves Commission:
Mailly Wood
Mailly Wood Cemetery was designed by Reginald Blomfield. 
Mailly-Maillet Communal Cemetery Extension
The smaller of the two military cemeteries, this was designed by Wilfred Clement Von Berg.

Population

See also
Communes of the Somme department

References

External links

 Mailly-Maillet website 

Communes of Somme (department)